Jennifer Taylor (née Bini, and sometimes credited as Jennifer Bini Taylor) is an American actress, best known for her role as Chelsea on CBS sitcom Two and a Half Men, and earlier, for three other roles on the show. She also appeared in the 1998 erotic thriller Wild Things and the faith base movie God's Not Dead: A Light in Darkness 2018.

Early life
She was born in Hoboken, New Jersey and grew up in Coral Springs, Florida. She was third runner-up in the 1995 Miss Florida USA pageant and first runner-up for 1996. She is of Italian descent.

Personal life
She lives in Los Angeles with her husband Paul Taylor and their two children. She has a BA in social sciences and, according to an interview, grows much of her family's food in her own garden.

Filmography

Film

Television

References

External links
 
 
 

Living people
American film actresses
American television actresses
Actresses from New Jersey
People from Coral Springs, Florida
People from Hoboken, New Jersey
Coral Springs High School alumni
20th-century American actresses
21st-century American actresses
Actresses from Los Angeles
American people of Italian descent
Year of birth missing (living people)